Fred "Freddie" van Rensburg was a South African professional snooker player.

Career
Rensburg challenged John Pulman for the World Championship title in early 1966. Pulman had played a series of matches against Rex Williams in South Africa in late 1965. Rensburg lost by 12 frames to 39.

Van Rensburg also held the South African Professional Championship from 1950, taking the title from Peter Mans, and defending it on a challenge basis until 1965 when he lost it to Perrie Mans, son of Peter.

References

South African snooker players